Sportclub Feyenoord, also known as Feyenoord AV, is an amateur football club from Rotterdam, Netherlands. It is the amateur branch of the professional football club Feyenoord. SC Feyenoord is playing in the Saturday Hoofdklasse (5th tier).

Feyenoord split its professional and amateur branches in 1978. Until the 2012–13 season, the amateur team played its matches in Sunday amateur football.

The club became champions of the 1995-96 Sunday Hoofdklasse A. At the time, the Hoofdklasse was the highest league of Dutch Sunday amateur football.

Managers
 Cesco Agterberg (2015–2017)

External links
 Official site

 
Football clubs in the Netherlands
Football clubs in Rotterdam
1908 establishments in the Netherlands
Association football clubs established in 1908